The following is a list of colleges and universities in the U.S. state of Illinois.

Public institutions

Two-year institutions

Four-year institutions

Private institutions

Non-profit

For-profit

Endowments

Defunct institutions
 Abingdon College (1853–1888), in Abingdon, merged with Eureka College in 1885, campus closed in 1888
Argosy University (2001–2019, Chicago, Schaumburg)
 Barat College (1858–2005), in Lake Forest, became a part of DePaul University in 2001. Barat campus closed in 2005.
 Brown's Business College (1876–1994), numerous locations around Illinois
 Dixon College (1881–c. 1915, Dixon)
 Evanston College for Ladies (1871–1873), merged with Northwestern University in 1873
 Hedding College (1855–1927), in Abingdon, absorbed by Illinois Wesleyan University in 1930
 Hillsboro College (1847–1852), in Hillsboro, moved to Springfield in 1852 as Illinois State University (1852–1870), moved to Carthage in 1870 and became Carthage College
 Illinois Institute of Art – Chicago (1916–2018, Chicago)
 Illinois Institute of Art – Schaumburg, in Schaumburg
 International Academy of Design & Technology – Schaumburg (1977–2015)
ITT Technical Institute (1969–2016, Arlington Heights, Oak Brook, Orland Park)
 Jubilee College (1839–1862), near Brimfield, Peoria County
 Judson College (1846–1860), in Mount Palatine
 Lincoln College (1865-2022), in Lincoln
 Lombard College (1853–1930), in Galesburg, after closing many students went to Knox College
MacMurray College (1846-2020), in Jacksonville
Mallinckrodt College (1916–1991, Wilmette), merged with Loyola University Chicago
 Midstate College, in Peoria
 Midwest College of Engineering (1967–1986), merged with Illinois Institute of Technology in 1986.
 Morthland College (2009–2018, West Frankfort)
 Mount Morris College (1879–1932), in Mount Morris
 University of Nauvoo (1841–1845), in Nauvoo
 Oregon Bible College (1939–1991), in Oregon
Robert Morris University Illinois (1913-2020), Chicago, merged with Roosevelt University.
 Shimer College (1853–2017, Mount Carroll, Waukegan, Chicago), merged with North Central College in Naperville in 2017
 Sparks College (1908-2009), in Shelbyville
 Solex College (1995–2018, Chicago, Wheeling) 
 St. Viator College (1865–1939), in Bourbonnais
 Shurtleff College (1827–1957), in Alton, was absorbed by Southern Illinois University when its campus became the SIU Alton Residence Center, one of the two precursors of Southern Illinois University Edwardsville. The campus now houses the School of Dental Medicine.
 State Community College of East Saint Louis (1969–1999), replaced by Metropolitan Community College around 1995, which was closed in 1999
 Vatterott College (1995–2018, Quincy, Fairview Heights)
 Westwood College (1953–2016, Calumet City, Chicago, Woodridge)
 William & Vashti College (1908–1918), in Aledo

See also

 List of college athletic programs in Illinois
 Higher education in the United States
 List of colleges and universities in Chicago
 List of recognized higher education accreditation organizations
 Lists of American institutions of higher education
 Illinois Veteran Grant

References

External links
Department of Education listing of accredited institutions in Illinois

Colleges and universities
Illinois, List of colleges and universities in